Silvano Varnhagen (born February 4, 1993) is a German footballer who plays for SV Eintracht Trier 05.

External links

1993 births
Living people
German footballers
Karlsruher SC players
3. Liga players
Sportspeople from Erfurt
Association football midfielders
Footballers from Thuringia